Nərəcan (also, Naradzhan and Neredzhan) is a village and municipality in the Khachmaz Rayon of Azerbaijan.  It has a population of 2,692.

References 

Populated places in Khachmaz District